Ribeaucourt may refer to the following places in France:

 Ribeaucourt, Meuse, a commune in the Meuse department
 Ribeaucourt, Somme, a commune in the Somme department